Plum blossom (Prunus mume) is an East Asian flowering tree species.

Plum blossom may also refer to:

Plum Blossom (film), 2000 South Korean coming-of-age film
The Plum Blossom, a patriotic song of the Republic of China (Taiwan) written in 1976
The Plum Blossoms, 1948 painting by Henri Matisse

See also

Plum (disambiguation)
Chinese plum (disambiguation)
Japanese plum (disambiguation)